Chouans! is a 1988 French historical adventure film directed by Philippe de Broca and starring Sophie Marceau, Philippe Noiret, and Lambert Wilson. Based on the 1829 novel Les Chouans by Honoré de Balzac, the film is about a woman who must choose between two brothers on opposite sides of the French Civil War of 1793. For her performance in the film, Sophie Marceau received the Cabourg Romantic Film Festival Award for Best Actress.

Plot
In 1793, during the French Revolution, a young woman named Céline (Sophie Marceau), who was adopted by Count Savinien de Kerfadec, must choose between two men who have been raised like her brothers, Tarquin Larmor (Lambert Wilson) and Aurèle de Kerfadec (Stéphane Freiss), while they take opposite sides in the conflict. Tarquin, also adopted by the Count, is a partisan of the First French Republic and defends the new political system; Aurèle, the Count's natural son, supports Royalism. Both sons are in love with Céline. After the French Revolutionary Army decimates the Breton people, an insurgency of peasants, clergy, and aristocrats launches a guerrilla war called the Chouannerie.

Cast
 Philippe Noiret as Savinien de Kerfadec 
 Sophie Marceau as Céline
 Lambert Wilson as Tarquin Larmor
 Stéphane Freiss as Aurèle de Kerfadec
 Charlotte de Turckheim as Olympe de Saint-Gildas
 Jean-Pierre Cassel as Baron de Tiffauges
 Roger Dumas as Bouchard 
 Raoul Billerey as Grospierre 
 Jacqueline Doyen as Adélaïde, l'Abbesse Marie de l'Assomption
 Vincent Schmitt as Lote 
 Claudine Delvaux as Jeanne 
 Jean Parédès as le Chapelain 
 Isabelle Gélinas as Viviane 
 Vincent de Bouard as Yvon 
 Maxime Leroux as Le Prêtre réfractaire 
 Luc-Antoine Diquéro as Le Sergent Pierrot 
 Claude Aufaure as Croque-au-sel 
 Michel Degand as Le Prêtre jureur

Production

Filming locations
 Baden, Morbihan, France 
 Belle Île, Morbihan, France 
 Brittany, France 
 Fort-la-Latte, Côtes-d'Armor, France 
 Locronan, Finistère, France 
 Meucon, Morbihan, France 
 Poul-Fétan, Quistinic, Morbihan, France 
 Sarzeau, Morbihan, France 
 Île d'Hoedic, Morbihan, France

Awards and nominations
 1988 Cabourg Romantic Film Festival Award for Best Actress (Sophie Marceau) Won
 1989 César Award for Most Promising Actor (Stéphane Freiss) Won
 1989 César Award Nomination for Best Costume Design (Yvonne Sassinot de Nesle)

References

External links
 
 

1988 films
Films set in 1793
Films based on works by Honoré de Balzac
Films directed by Philippe de Broca
1980s French-language films
French Revolution films
Films scored by Georges Delerue
1980s historical films
French historical films
1980s French films